Monégasque Olympic Committee is the National Olympic Committee representing Monaco.

See also
Monaco at the Olympics

External links
 

Monaco
Olympic
Monaco at the Olympics
1907 establishments in Monaco
Sports organizations established in 1907